Hausdalshorga is a mountain in the city of Bergen in Vestland county, Norway.  It is located near the Gullfjellet mountain massif.

See also
List of mountains of Norway

References

Mountains of Bergen